Dog and Cat is an American television series that aired  on ABC on Saturday night at 10:00 p.m Eastern time in 1977.

Premise
Lou Antonio played Sgt. Jack Ramsey, an undercover detective with the Los Angeles Police Department, who found himself teamed with a very green partner named J.Z. Kane (Kim Basinger). Together they formed a relationship based on friendship and trust (completely platonic) that led to them capturing many of L.A.'s criminals. Lieutenant Arthur Kipling (Matt Clark) was their boss.

"Dog and Cat" is a slang term used by police officers to denote a male-female partnership.
The show is especially remembered for the car that Kim Basinger used in the series: a souped-up Volkswagen Beetle with a Porsche engine.

Production History
Lawrence Gordon pitched the show to ABC who bought it. He took it to Paramount who produced it. The show was one of the first supervised by Brandon Tartikoff when he was at ABC.

It replaced Most Wanted which moved to Monday night.

Reception

Critical
The New York Times described one of the earliest episodes, "Live Bait", about a rapist, as "a particularly repulsive tale" and thought the male lead was a rip-off of Baretta and the female lead too obviously inspired by Charlie's Angels.

The Washington Post said Antonio does "a nice, grumpy job" and Basinger was "a little saltier than Angie Dickinson's Pepper" but liked the fact it was not overly violent and "had a sense of humour. It could be around in the fall."

Ratings
The first episode after the pilot was meant to be "Live Bait", about a rapist, but was changed to be about a corrupt cop. It got a 40% rating and was the 23rd most watched show of the week.

Joel Silver reported that Walter Hill's original pilot script inspired Shane Black to write Lethal Weapon.

Credits

Directed by:
Bob Kelljan	 	
Writing credits (in alphabetical order)
Heywood Gould	 	
Tom Greene	 	
Walter Hill	 	
William Keys	 	
Owen Morgan	 	(also story)
Henry Rosenbaum
Credited cast
Lou Antonio	.... 	Jack Ramsey
Kim Basinger	.... 	Officer J.Z. Kane
Matt Clark	.... 	Lt. Arthur Kipling
Charles Cioffi	.... 	Ralph Travan
Richard Lynch	.... 	Shirley
Dale Robinette	.... 	Nicholas Evans
Janit Baldwin	.... 	Roeanne Lee Peters
Geoffrey Scott	.... 	David Storey
Lesley Woods	.... 	Velma
Matt Bennett	.... 	Gonzo
Walt Davis	.... 	Trog
Dick Wesson	.... 	Zink Kauffen
rest of cast listed alphabetically:
Lynn Borden	.... 	Mavis
Richard Forbes	.... 	Earl Seagram
James Hall	.... 	Frank
Dianne Kay	.... 	Connie
Frank McRae	.... 	Morgue Attendant
Catherane Skillen		
Jim Storm	.... 	Change Maker
Ken Sylk	.... 	Doty
Betty Thomas	.... 	Waitress

Episode Guide

References

External links 
 
Dog and Cat at CTVA
Review of pilot

1977 American television series debuts
1977 American television series endings
1970s American crime television series
Television series by CBS Studios
American Broadcasting Company original programming
Fictional portrayals of the Los Angeles Police Department
Television shows set in Los Angeles